Ronni Moesgaard Bagge (born October 5, 1984 in Grædstrup) is a Danish professional football player who currently plays for the Danish Superliga club Vejle Boldklub.

External links
 Vejle Boldklub profile

1984 births
Danish men's footballers
Living people
Vejle Boldklub players
Thisted FC players
Association football midfielders